André António Filipe Agostinho Perre (born 7 November 1989) is a Portuguese football player who plays for Caldas.

Club career
He made his professional debut in the Segunda Liga for Famalicão on 6 August 2016 in a game against Leixões.

References

External links
 

1989 births
Living people
People from Alcobaça, Portugal
Portuguese footballers
S.C.U. Torreense players
C.D. Fátima players
U.D. Leiria players
F.C. Famalicão players
Merelinense F.C. players
A.C. Marinhense players
Caldas S.C. players
Campeonato de Portugal (league) players
Liga Portugal 2 players
Association football midfielders
Sportspeople from Leiria District